William Gwyn Thomas (22 October 1892 – 11 January 1984) was a Welsh rugby union, and professional rugby league footballer who played in the 1910s and 1920s who played rugby union (RU) for Cardiff and London Welsh, and representative level rugby league (RL) for Great Britain, Wales and Other Nationalities, and at club level for Wigan and Huddersfield, as a  or , i.e. number 1, or, 3 or 4.

It was claimed that Thomas played rugby union for Barbarian F.C. against South Africa in November 1915. However the Barbarians website say that it wasn't him, that instead it was another Gwyn Thomas who also played rugby union for Neath RFC.  

Whilst playing for Huddersfield Thomas was selected to go on the 1920 Great Britain Lions tour of Australasia. He was vice-captain, and played at fullback in all three Test matches of the Ashes series. He also played in two Test matches against New Zealand.

During the 1921–22 Kangaroo tour Thomas was selected to play for Great Britain at  against Australia in all three test matches of the Ashes, which was won by the British.

References

External links
!Great Britain Statistics at englandrl.co.uk (statistics currently missing due to not having appeared for both Great Britain, and England)
Statistics at wigan.rlfans.com

1892 births
1984 deaths
Barbarian F.C. players
Cardiff RFC players
Footballers who switched code
Great Britain national rugby league team players
Huddersfield Giants players
London Welsh RFC players
Other Nationalities rugby league team players
Place of birth missing
Place of death missing
Rugby league centres
Rugby league fullbacks
Rugby league players from Treherbert
Rugby union players from Treherbert
Wales national rugby league team players
Welsh rugby league players
Welsh rugby union players
Wigan Warriors players